The Oregon Chief Education Office was a government agency created by statute (Senate Bill 215-B of the 78th Oregon Legislative Assembly) in 2014 by the state of Oregon. Its stated mission was "to build and coordinate a seamless system of education that meets the diverse learning needs of Oregonians from birth through college and career," through the efforts of five subsidiary divisions also created or relocated from elsewhere in the state government's organizational hierarchy to come under its leadership by the same statute:
 Oregon Early Learning Division
 Oregon Department of Education
 Oregon Youth Development Division
 Oregon Higher Education Coordinating Commission
 Oregon Teachers Standards and Practices Commission

The Chief Education Office sunset legislatively on June 30, 2019, with its functions transferring to other state agencies.

References

External links 

2014 establishments in Oregon
2019 disestablishments in Oregon
Public education in Oregon
Government of Oregon
State agencies of Oregon